Dammam College of Technology is a governmental technical college located in Dammam, eastern Saudi Arabia, was founded in 1986. The college mainly focuses on technical and vocational training to prepare students for careers. It is one of the technical colleges that are governed by the Technical and Vocational Training Corporation (TVTC), the government provider of training in the kingdom.

DCT offers a range of technical and vocational programs in various fields of study, including engineering technology, information technology, business administration, industrial technology, and health sciences. These programs are designed to provide students with the practical skills and knowledge needed to meet the demands of the local job market and contribute to the economic development of the region. 

In April 2019, a trainee from this college won an award in 47th International Exhibition of Inventions of Geneva, for an invention about power generation from the sand.

Programs 
This college offers a variety of degree programs including electronic technology, mechanical technology, civil and architectural technology, management and business technology, and electrical technology.

See also 

 Technical and Vocational Training Corporation
 List of technical colleges in Saudi Arabia

References 

Vocational education in Saudi Arabia
Technical universities and colleges in Saudi Arabia
Education in Dammam
1986 establishments in Saudi Arabia